

History 
EatOut was founded by Mikul Shah in 2010. The company raised $300,000 in equity investment from a Netherlands-based African Media Venture Fund (AMVF), in 2013 and expanded its product portfolio by launching an events business unit. In 2015 EatOut added a publishing business arm with the launch of Yummy Magazine, the region's first and only freely distributed lifestyle magazine with a focus on food & drink.

In 2016 EatOut acquired regional East African start-ups. The Pearl Guide Uganda and Eating in Kigali. The same year EatOut raised a further equity investment of $500,000 from Kenyan fin-tech company Craft Silicon to launch a restaurant loyalty and payments platform.

Partnerships 

In October 2012, Wazi WiFi, Google, and EatOut partnered to encourage restaurants to offer Wazi WiFi hotspots.

EatOut also partnered with Safaricom and Kopo Kopo in April 2013 to encourage more restaurants to accept M-Pesa as a payment method.

EatOut sponsors the Best Food Blogger for the Bloggers Association of Kenya Awards

EatOut & Facebook host SME workshops in Nairobi for SMWI Conference

Michelin Starred Chef heading to Nairobi to launch Nairobi Restaurant Week 2017

EatOut & CFC Stanbic Bank launch Yummy Card Program

Investors 

Africa Media Venture Fund (AMVF), a Dutch venture fund focused on tech-based media companies, invested in EatOut in July 2012 and holds a minority stake in the company.

Awards and recognition 
2017
 Finalist for Facebook Bots for Messenger Africa & Middle East Challenge
 Stanford GSB SEED Cohort 2 in East Africa
 Visa Fintech Bootcamp in Africa
 Hosts former Noma Chefs in Nairobi for One Star House Party
2016
 EatOut founder Mikul Shah selected as Business Daily Top 40 under 40 Men
 Featured On CNBC Africa's, Eye On Kenya
2015
 First African company to be presenting with Facebook at DMEXCO 2015 InCologne 
 EatOut founder appointed to Safaricom SPARK innovation fund
2014
 Finalist for Company of the Year - Social Media Awards
2013
 CIO100 East Africa award
 Selected for VC4Africa 2013 Cohort
2012
 Kenya Tourism Award for Digital Media 
 Tandaa World Bank Content Grant 
 CIO 100 First Runner Up 

2011
 Samsung Bada Best Mobile Application 
 Vision 2030 ICT Innovation for Tourism 
 Pivot 25 Finalist

References

External links 
 
  Taste Ltd. 

 Burp!

Kenyan websites